Assasuni (Aashashooni, Ashashuni , means hearing the hope ) is an upazila of Satkhira District in Khulna Division, Bangladesh.

Geography 
It has 40,735 households and a total area of 402.36 km2.

Marichchap, Kholpetua, Betna and Kopothakkho are rivers of Assasuni.

Demographics
In the 1991 Bangladesh census, Assasuni had a population of 220,957. Males constituted 50.07% of the population, and females 49.93%. The population above the age of 18 was 110,961, with a literacy rate of 30.3% (7+ years), below the national average of 32.4%.

, Assasuni had a population of 268,754. Males constituted 49.86% of the population and females 50.14%. Muslims formed 72.94% of the population, Hindus 26.46%, Christians 0.50% and others 0.10%. Assasuni had a literacy rate of 49.83% for the population 7 years and above.

Administration
Assasuni Upazila is divided into 11 union parishads: Anulia, Assasuni, Baradal, Budhhata, Durgapur, Kadakati, Khajra, Kulla, Pratapnagar, Sobhnali, and Sreeula. The union parishads are subdivided into 143 mauzas and 241 villages.

Education
 Champaful Acharcha Profullo Chandra High School
 Kalima Khali Azizia Siddikia senior Fazil Madrasha
 Kalima Khali Govt. Primary School
 Sriula High School
 Tuardanga H,F High school
 Harivanga High School
 Harivanga Govt.Primary School 
 68 No. Sriula Govt. Primary School
 Assasuni Government High School
 Dargahpur S.K.R.H. Higher Secondary School
 Assasuni Govt College
 Budhhata B,B,M collegiate School
 GUNAKARKATI SHAH MUHAMMAD YAHYA SECONDARY SCHOOL
 Assasuni Secondary Girl's High School
 Chapra High School
 Kunduria High School
 Mariala High School
 A.P.S Degree College
 Kadakati Arar High School
 Mohiskur Govt. Primary School
 Goaldanga Fakirbari High School
 Bichhat new model high school
 Batra Ebtedai Madrasha 
 Bardal Secondary Girl's High School
 Baradal Aftabuddin Collegiate School
 Goaldanga Sukkulia Dakhil Madrasa
 Baradal Dakhil Madrasa
 Fakrabad Girls School
 Puijala BMRB HIGH SCHOOL
 Kodanda Secondary School
 Fakrabad Govt Primary School
 Fakrabad Adarsha Gram School
 Fakrabad Hafezia Madrasa
 Baintala R.C High school
 Troydoshpolli High School, Baintala
 Baintala Govt. Primary school
 Godara almadani Dakhil madrasha.
 Komlapur Govt. Primary School
 Sreeula Govt. Primary School
 Sonai Govt.Primary School
 Sabdalpur Govt. Primary School
 Khariati Secondary School
 Mohisha Danga Collegiate School

Environmental issues 
Assasuni is now under severe natural threat. Water logging is miserable during the rainy season. Cyclone Aila affected Assasuni badly in 2009. Crops failed tremendously. The earthen embankments and seawalls are always on the threat of erosion during every rainy seasons.

References

External links 
 

 
Satkhira District
Khulna Division
Upazilas of Satkhira District